WFSD-LP (107.9 FM) is a low-power FM radio station broadcasting a Christian inspirational format. Licensed to Tallahassee, Florida, United States, the station is currently owned by Tallahassee First Seventh-day Adventist Church, affiliated with LifeTalk Radio.

References

External links
 Tallahassee First SDA Church website
 

Seventh-day Adventist media
FSD-LP
FSD-LP
Radio stations established in 2006
2006 establishments in Florida
FSD-LP